Invicta Dynamos are the senior, semi-professional, ice hockey team based in Gillingham in Kent. The season runs from September to April. They usually play their home games on a Sunday at 17:15. They share their home with the Invicta Mustangs whose colours are blue, white, grey and red.

History
The club was founded in 1997 replacing the Medway Bears as the senior team based at the Ice Bowl. The club originally competed in the EPIHL until the 2003/4 season when the club dropped down to the ENIHL due to a lack of sponsorship. Invicta is one of the larger clubs at this level and has enjoyed a period of sustained success including winning the ENIHL Grand Slam in 2005/6. The most successful season in the Dynamos history came in the 2001/02 season when they were the champions of the EPIHL, winning the league and playoffs and losing the cup final to local rivals the Romford Raiders.

The club's fiercest rivalry has traditionally been with the Raiders IHC and to a slightly lesser extent the Chelmsford Chieftains, with the Dynamos competing in the same league as the two Essex clubs for its first six seasons. However more recently a healthy rivalry has developed with Streatham IHC due to the geographical proximity of the two clubs.

Club roster 2022-23
(*) Denotes a Non-British Trained player (Import)

2021/22 Outgoing

Top 5 All-time points scorers 
As of 07/07/19

Club Honours

1997-98
English Division 1 Southern Champions

2001-02
EPIHL Champions
EPIHL Playoff Champions

2002-03
ENIHL Southern Champions
ENIHL Southern Playoff Champions

2003-04
ENIHL Southern Champions
ENIHL Southern Playoff Champions
Kent & Essex Cup Champions

2004-05
ENIHL Southern Champions

2005-06
ENIHL Southern Champions
ENIHL National Champions
ENIHL Playoff Champions
ENIHL Cup Champions

2006-07
ENIHL Southern (Conference B) Champions

2007-08
ENIHL Southern Champions
ENIHL National Champions

2009-10
ENIHL Southern Champions

2014-15
NIHL Southern Cup Champions

Other Ice Hockey teams based in Gillingham
 Invicta Dynamics (Ladies)
 Invicta Mustangs (Second senior team)
 Invicta Colts (Under 18's)
 Invicta Junior Dynamos (Under 16's)
 Invicta Dynamites (Under 14's)
 Invicta Devils (Under 12's)
 Invicta Imps (Under 10's)
 Invicta Knights (Recreational)
 Medway Madness (Recreational)
 Medway Eagles (Beginner Recreational)
 Medway Marauders (Recreational)
 Kent Knights (University)

References

External links
Official website

 
Ice hockey teams in England
Sport in Medway
Ice hockey clubs established in 1997